Antonio Brancalion (born 5 February 1976) is an Italian former professional boxer who competed from 1996 to 2010. He held the European Union light-heavyweight title from 2007 to 2009, and challenged three times for the European light-heavyweight title.

Professional career
Brancalion made his professional debut on 20 December 1996, winning a six-round points decision over Stefan Magyar. His first three losses were all against Vincenzo Imparato, with the Italy super-middleweight title at stake each time. On 29 October 2004, Brancalion won his first regional championship—the vacant IBF International light-heavyweight title—by stopping Gabor Halasz in six rounds. Brancalion made his first of three attempts at winning the European light-heavyweight title on 7 January 2006, losing a wide unanimous decision to Stipe Drews. A year later, on 24 March 2007, Brancalion won the vacant European Union light-heavyweight title by majority decision over Kai Kurzawa. Two defences were made, against Tomas Adamek on 28 June 2007 (via split decision) and Dario Cichello on 2 December 2008 (via unanimous decision).

On 6 June 2009, Brancalion tried for a second time to win the European light-heavyweight title, but was stopped in one round by defending champion Jürgen Brähmer. Brancalion's third attempt at the now-vacant title came against Nathan Cleverly on 13 February 2010. 

he is currently incarcerated in the Rovigo prison for a sum of sentences

Professional boxing record

References

External links

Italian male boxers
Super-middleweight boxers
Light-heavyweight boxers
1976 births
Living people
Sportspeople from the Province of Rovigo
People from Rovigo